Annagh Church is a medieval church and National Monument in County Kerry, Ireland.

The church dates to the 12th–15th centuries. There are many ancient sites in the area: Tonakilla Fort, a ringfort and standing stones.

The doorway is unusual in Ireland, with drip-moulding completely around it, making it similar to the Anglo-Norman style.

References

Religion in County Kerry
Archaeological sites in County Kerry
National Monuments in County Kerry
Former churches in the Republic of Ireland
Buildings and structures in Tralee